Orthopedic surgery or orthopedics (alternatively spelt orthopaedics), is the branch of surgery concerned with conditions involving the musculoskeletal system. Orthopedic surgeons use both surgical and nonsurgical means to treat musculoskeletal trauma, spine diseases, sports injuries, degenerative diseases, infections, tumors, and congenital disorders.

Etymology 

The word was assimilated into English as orthopædics; the ligature æ was common in that era for ae in Greek- and Latin-based words. As the name implies, the discipline was initially developed with attention to children, but the correction of spinal and bone deformities in all stages of life eventually became the cornerstone of orthopedic practice.

Differences in spelling 
As with many words derived with the "æ" ligature, simplification to either "ae" or just "e" is common, especially in North America. In the US, the majority of college, university, and residency programmes, and even the American Academy of Orthopaedic Surgeons, still use the spelling with the digraph ae, though hospitals usually use the shortened form. Elsewhere, usage is not uniform; in Canada, both spellings are acceptable; "orthopaedics" is the normal spelling in the UK in line with other fields which retain "ae".

History

Early orthopedics 
Many developments in orthopedic surgery have resulted from experiences during wartime. On the battlefields of the Middle Ages, the injured were treated with bandages soaked in horses' blood, which dried to form a stiff, if unsanitary, splint.

Originally, the term orthopedics meant the correcting of musculoskeletal deformities in children. Nicolas Andry, a professor of medicine at the University of Paris, coined the term in the first textbook written on the subject in 1741. He advocated the use of exercise, manipulation, and splinting to treat deformities in children. His book was directed towards parents, and while some topics would be familiar to orthopedists today, it also included 'excessive sweating of the palms' and freckles.

Jean-André Venel established the first orthopedic institute in 1780, which was the first hospital dedicated to the treatment of children's skeletal deformities. He developed the club-foot shoe for children born with foot deformities and various methods to treat curvature of the spine.

Advances made in surgical technique during the 18th century, such as John Hunter's research on tendon healing and Percival Pott's work on spinal deformity steadily increased the range of new methods available for effective treatment. Robert Chessher, a pioneering British orthopedist, invented the double-inclined plane, used to treat lower-body bone fractures, in 1790. Antonius Mathijsen, a Dutch military surgeon, invented the plaster of Paris cast in 1851. Until the 1890s, though, orthopedics was still a study limited to the correction of deformity in children. One of the first surgical procedures developed was percutaneous tenotomy. This involved cutting a tendon, originally the Achilles tendon, to help treat deformities alongside bracing and exercises. In the late 1800s and first decades of the 1900s, significant controversy arose about whether orthopedics should include surgical procedures at all.

Modern orthopedics 
Examples of people who aided the development of modern orthopedic surgery were Hugh Owen Thomas, a surgeon from Wales, and his nephew, Robert Jones. Thomas became interested in orthopedics and bone-setting at a young age, and after establishing his own practice, went on to expand the field into the general treatment of fracture and other musculoskeletal problems. He advocated enforced rest as the best remedy for fractures and tuberculosis, and created the so-called "Thomas splint" to stabilize a fractured femur and prevent infection. He is also responsible for numerous other medical innovations that all carry his name: Thomas's collar to treat tuberculosis of the cervical spine, Thomas's maneuvere, an orthopedic investigation for fracture of the hip joint, the Thomas test, a method of detecting hip deformity by having the patient lying flat in bed, and Thomas's wrench for reducing fractures, as well as an osteoclast to break and reset bones.

Thomas's work was not fully appreciated in his own lifetime. Only during the First World War did his techniques come to be used for injured soldiers on the battlefield. His nephew, Sir Robert Jones, had already made great advances in orthopedics in his position as surgeon-superintendent for the construction of the Manchester Ship Canal in 1888. He was responsible for the injured among the 20,000 workers, and he organized the first comprehensive accident service in the world, dividing the 36-mile site into three sections, and establishing a hospital and a string of first-aid posts in each section. He had the medical personnel trained in fracture management. He personally managed 3,000 cases and performed 300 operations in his own hospital. This position enabled him to learn new techniques and improve the standard of fracture management. Physicians from around the world came to Jones' clinic to learn his techniques. Along with Alfred Tubby, Jones founded the British Orthopedic Society in 1894.

During the First World War, Jones served as a Territorial Army surgeon. He observed that treatment of fractures both, at the front and in hospitals at home, was inadequate, and his efforts led to the introduction of military orthopedic hospitals. He was appointed Inspector of Military Orthopedics, with responsibility for 30,000 beds. The hospital in Ducane Road, Hammersmith, became the model for both British and American military orthopedic hospitals. His advocacy of the use of Thomas splint for the initial treatment of femoral fractures reduced mortality of compound fractures of the femur from 87% to less than 8% in the period from 1916 to 1918.

The use of intramedullary rods to treat fractures of the femur and tibia was pioneered by Gerhard Küntscher of Germany. This made a noticeable difference to the speed of recovery of injured German soldiers during World War II and led to more widespread adoption of intramedullary fixation of fractures in the rest of the world. Traction was the standard method of treating thigh bone fractures until the late 1970s, though, when the Harborview Medical Center group in Seattle popularized intramedullary fixation without opening up the fracture.

The modern total hip replacement was pioneered by Sir John Charnley, expert in tribology at Wrightington Hospital, in England in the 1960s. He found that joint surfaces could be replaced by implants cemented to the bone. His design consisted of a stainless steel, one-piece femoral stem and head, and a polyethylene acetabular component, both of which were fixed to the bone using PMMA (acrylic) bone cement. For over two decades, the Charnley low-friction arthroplasty and its derivative designs were the most-used systems in the world. This formed the basis for all modern hip implants.

The Exeter hip replacement system (with a slightly different stem geometry) was developed at the same time. Since Charnley, improvements have been continuous in the design and technique of joint replacement (arthroplasty) with many contributors, including W. H. Harris, the son of R. I. Harris, whose team at Harvard pioneered uncemented arthroplasty techniques with the bone bonding directly to the implant.

Knee replacements, using similar technology, were started by McIntosh in rheumatoid arthritis patients and later by Gunston and Marmor for osteoarthritis in the 1970s, developed by Dr. John Insall in New York using a fixed bearing system, and by Dr. Frederick Buechel and Dr. Michael Pappas using a mobile bearing system.

External fixation of fractures was refined by American surgeons during the Vietnam War, but a major contribution was made by Gavril Abramovich Ilizarov in the USSR. He was sent, without much orthopedic training, to look after injured Russian soldiers in Siberia in the 1950s. With no equipment, he was confronted with crippling conditions of unhealed, infected, and misaligned fractures. With the help of the local bicycle shop, he devised ring external fixators tensioned like the spokes of a bicycle. With this equipment, he achieved healing, realignment, and lengthening to a degree unheard of elsewhere. His Ilizarov apparatus is still used today as one of the distraction osteogenesis methods.

Modern orthopedic surgery and musculoskeletal research have sought to make surgery less invasive and to make implanted components better and more durable. On the other hand, since the emergence of the opioid epidemic, Orthopedic Surgeons have been identified as one of the highest prescribers of opioid medications. The future of Orthopedic Surgery will likely focus on finding ways for the profession to decrease prescription of opioids while still providing adequate pain control for patients.

Training 

In the United States, orthopedic surgeons have typically completed four years of undergraduate education and four years of medical school and earned either a Doctor of Medicine (MD) or Doctor of Osteopathic Medicine (DO) degree. Subsequently, these medical school graduates undergo residency training in orthopedic surgery. The five-year residency is a categorical orthopedic surgery training.

Selection for residency training in orthopedic surgery is very competitive. Roughly 700 physicians complete orthopedic residency training per year in the United States. About 10% of current orthopedic surgery residents are women; about 20% are members of minority groups. Around 20,400 actively practicing orthopedic surgeons and residents are in the United States. According to the latest Occupational Outlook Handbook (2011–2012) published by the United States Department of Labor, 3–4% of all practicing physicians are orthopedic surgeons.

Many orthopedic surgeons elect to do further training, or fellowships, after completing their residency training. Fellowship training in an orthopedic sub-specialty is typically one year in duration (sometimes two) and sometimes has a research component involved with the clinical and operative training. Examples of orthopedic subspecialty training in the United States are:
 Foot and ankle surgery
 Hand and upper extremity
 Hip and Knee surgery
 Orthopedic oncologist
 Orthopedic trauma
 Osseointegration
 Pediatric orthopedics
 Shoulder and elbow
 Spine surgery
 Surgical sports medicine
 Total joint reconstruction (arthroplasty)

These specialized areas of medicine are not exclusive to orthopedic surgery. For example, hand surgery is practiced by some plastic surgeons, and spine surgery is practiced by most neurosurgeons. Additionally, some aspects of foot and ankle surgery are also practiced by board-certified doctors of podiatric medicine (DPM) in the United States. Some family practice physicians practice sports medicine, but their scope of practice is nonoperative.

After completion of specialty residency or registrar training, an orthopedic surgeon is then eligible for board certification by the American Board of Medical Specialties or the American Osteopathic Association Bureau of Osteopathic Specialists. Certification by the American Board of Orthopedic Surgery or the American Osteopathic Board of Orthopedic Surgery means that the orthopedic surgeon has met the specified educational, evaluation, and examination requirements of the board. The process requires successful completion of a standardized written examination followed by an oral examination focused on the surgeon's clinical and surgical performance over a 6-month period. In Canada, the certifying organization is the Royal College of Physicians and Surgeons of Canada; in Australia and New Zealand, it is the Royal Australasian College of Surgeons.

In the United States, specialists in hand surgery and orthopedic sports medicine may obtain a certificate of added qualifications  in addition to their board primary certification by successfully completing a separate standardized examination. No additional certification process exists for the other subspecialties.

Practice 

According to applications for board certification from 1999 to 2003, the top 25 most common procedures (in order) performed by orthopedic surgeons are:
 Knee arthroscopy and meniscectomy
 Shoulder arthroscopy and decompression
 Carpal tunnel release
 Knee arthroscopy and chondroplasty
 Removal of support implant
 Knee arthroscopy and anterior cruciate ligament reconstruction
 Knee replacement
 Repair of femoral neck fracture
 Repair of trochanteric fracture
 Debridement of skin/muscle/bone/ fracture
 Knee arthroscopy repair of both menisci
 Hip replacement
 Shoulder arthroscopy/distal clavicle excision
 Repair of rotator cuff tendon
 Repair fracture of radius (bone)/ulna
 Laminectomy
 Repair of ankle fracture (bimalleolar type)
 Shoulder arthroscopy and debridement
 Lumbar spinal fusion
 Repair fracture of the distal part of radius
 Low back intervertebral disc surgery
 Incise finger tendon sheath
 Repair of ankle fracture (fibula)
 Repair of femoral shaft fracture
 Repair of trochanteric fracture

A typical schedule for a practicing orthopedic surgeon involves 50–55 hours of work per week divided among clinic, surgery, various administrative duties, and possibly teaching and/or research if in an academic setting. According to the American Association of Medical Colleges in 2021, the average work week of an orthopedic surgeon was 57 hours. This is a very low estimation however, as research derived from a 2013 survey of orthopedic surgeons who self identified as "highly successful" due to their prominent positions in the field indicated average work weeks of 70 hours or more.

Arthroscopy 

The use of arthroscopic techniques has been particularly important for injured patients. Arthroscopy was pioneered in the early 1950s by Dr. Masaki Watanabe of Japan to perform minimally invasive cartilage surgery and reconstructions of torn ligaments. Arthroscopy allows patients to recover from the surgery in a matter of days, rather than the weeks to months required by conventional, "open" surgery; it is a very popular technique. Knee arthroscopy is one of the most common operations performed by orthopedic surgeons today, and is often combined with meniscectomy or chondroplasty. The majority of upper-extremity outpatient orthopedic procedures are now performed arthroscopically.

Arthroplasty 

Arthroplasty is an orthopedic surgery where the articular surface of a musculoskeletal joint is replaced, remodeled, or realigned by osteotomy or some other procedure. It is an elective procedure that is done to relieve pain and restore function to the joint after damage by arthritis (rheumasurgery) or some other type of trauma. As well as the standard total knee replacement surgery, the uni-compartmental knee replacement, in which only one weight-bearing surface of an arthritic knee is replaced, is a popular alternative.

Joint replacements are available for other joints on a variable basis, most notably the hip, shoulder, elbow, wrist, ankle, spine, and finger joints.

In recent years, surface replacement of joints, in particular the hip joint, has become more popular amongst younger and more active patients. This type of operation delays the need for the more traditional and less bone-conserving total hip replacement, but carries significant risks of early failure from fracture and bone death.

One of the main problems with joint replacements is wear of the bearing surfaces of components. This can lead to damage to the surrounding bone and contribute to eventual failure of the implant. The use of alternative bearing surfaces has increased in recent years, particularly in younger patients, in an attempt to improve the wear characteristics of joint replacement components. These include ceramics and all-metal implants (as opposed to the original metal-on-plastic). The plastic chosen is usually ultra-high-molecular-weight polyethylene, which can also be altered in ways that may improve wear characteristics.

Epidemiology 
Between 2001 and 2016, the prevalence of musculoskeletal procedures drastically increased in the U.S, from 17.9% to 24.2% of all operating-room (OR) procedures performed during hospital stays.

In a study of hospitalizations in the United States in 2012, spine and joint procedures were common among all age groups except infants. Spinal fusion was one of the five most common OR procedures performed in every age group except infants younger than 1 year and adults 85 years and older. Laminectomy was common among adults aged 18–84 years. Knee arthroplasty and hip replacement were in the top five OR procedures for adults aged 45 years and older.

See also 

 Bone grafting
 Index of trauma and orthopedics articles
 List of orthopedic implants
 Orthopaedic physician's assistant
 Orthotics
 Outline of trauma and orthopedics

References

External links 
 

 
Surgical specialties